Fearless is a 1993 American drama film directed by Peter Weir and starring Jeff Bridges, Isabella Rossellini, Rosie Perez and John Turturro. It was written by Rafael Yglesias, adapted from his novel of the same name.

Rosie Perez was nominated for an Academy Award for Best Supporting Actress for her role as Carla Rodrigo. The film was also entered into the 44th Berlin International Film Festival. Jeff Bridges' role as Max Klein is widely regarded as one of the best performances of his career. The film's soundtrack features part of the first movement of Henryk Górecki's Symphony No. 3, subtitled Symphony of Sorrowful Songs. The film's screenwriter was inspired to write the script after he was in a car accident. Yglesias began writing the story after reading about United Airlines Flight 232, that crashed in Sioux City, Iowa, in 1989.

Plot
Max Klein survives an airline crash. The plane plummets, but strangely Max is calm. His calm enables him to dispel fear in the flight cabin. He sits next to Byron Hummel, a young boy flying alone. Flight attendants move through the cabin, telling another passenger, Carla Rodrigo, traveling with an infant, to hold the infant in her lap as the plane plummets out of control, while telling other passengers to buckle into their seats. Max was telling his business partner, Jeff Gordon, of his fear of flying as they took off.

In the aftermath of the crash, most passengers died. Among the few survivors, most are terribly injured. Max is unhurt. The crash site is chaotic, filled with first responders and other emergency personnel. Focusing on the survivors, a team of investigators from the FAA and the airline company conduct interviews. Max is repelled by all the chaos. He is disgusted by the investigators wanting to interview him.

Max rents a car and starts driving home. Along the way he meets an old girlfriend from high school, Alison. They last met 20 years ago. At the restaurant Alison notices Max eating a strawberry. Max is allergic to strawberries. Max grins. He finishes the strawberry without an allergic reaction. The next morning, he is accosted by FBI investigators.  They question his choice to not contact family to tell them he is fine. The airline representative offers him train tickets. Max asks for airline tickets. He wants to fly home, having no fear of air travel. The airline books him on the flight. They seat him next to Dr. Bill Perlman, the airline's psychiatrist.

Dr. Perlman annoyingly tags behind Max back to his home, prodding him for information about the crash. Max is forced to snap back at the psychiatrist rudely, to be rid of him. Laura Klein, Max's wife, notices the strange behavior. Max seems different, changed somehow. Max's late business partner's wife, Nan Gordon, asks about Jeff's last moments. Max says Jeff died in the crash.

The media call Max "The Good Samaritan" in news reports. The boy Max sat next to, Byron, publicly thanks him in television interviews, for the way he comforted passengers while the plane fell out of control during the crash. Max is a hero.

Max avoids the press and becomes distant from Laura and his son Jonah. His persona is radically changed. He is preoccupied with his new perspective on life following his near-death experience. He begins drawing abstract pictures of the crash. As he survived without injury, he thinks himself invulnerable to death. Because of his confidence, Dr. Perlman encourages Max to meet with another survivor, Carla Rodrigo, whose infant was held in her lap while the plane fell. Carla struggles with survivor's guilt, and is traumatized for not holding onto him tightly enough, although she was following the flight attendant's instructions. Max and Carla develop a close friendship. He helps her to get past the trauma, to free herself from guilt, deliberately crashing his car to show that it was physically impossible for any person to hold onto anything due to the forces of the crash.

Attorney Steven Brillstein encourages Max to exaggerate testimony, to maximize the settlement offer from the airline. Max reluctantly agrees when he is confronted with Nan's financial predicament as a widow. Cognitive dissonance spurs Max to a panic attack. He runs out of the office, to the roof of the building. He climbs onto the roof's edge. As Max stands on the ledge, looking down at the streets below, his panic subsides. He rejoices in fearlessness. Laura finds Max on the ledge. He is spinning around on the ledge with his overcoat billowing across his face.

Brillstein arrives at the Klein home to celebrate the airline's settlement offer. He brings a fruit basket. Max eats one of the strawberries. This time he experiences an allergic reaction. Max is resuscitated by Laura and survives. He recovers his emotional connection to his family, to the world and to the reality of yet another chance at life.

Cast
 Jeff Bridges as Max Klein
 Isabella Rossellini as Laura Klein
 Rosie Perez as Carla Rodrigo
 Tom Hulce as Steven Brillstein
 John Turturro as Dr. Bill Perlman
 Benicio del Toro as Manny Rodrigo
 Deirdre O'Connell as Nan Gordon
 John de Lancie as Jeff Gordon
 Debra Monk as Alison
 William Newman as Elderly Man

Aesthetic elements
A book containing the painting The Ascent into the Empyrean by Hieronymus Bosch is shown, and it is said that the dying go into the light of heaven "naked and alone".  Near the finale as Max lies on the ground, he relives moving from the fuselage of the aircraft and for a moment moves towards the tunnel of light that appears to be modeled on the painting.

Reception
On Rotten Tomatoes the film has an approval rating of 85% based on reviews from 41 critics, with an average score of 7.8/10. The site's consensus states "This underrated gem from director Peter Weir features an outstanding performance from Jeff Bridges as a man dealing with profound grief." Audiences polled by CinemaScore gave the film a grade of "B+" on an A+ to F scale.

Roger Ebert of the Chicago Sun-Times gave it 3 out of 4 stars and wrote: ""Fearless" is like a short story that shines a bright light, briefly, into a corner where you usually do not look."
Vincent Canby of The New York Times said "Mr. Bridges does well with a difficult role", and Todd McCarthy of
Variety called it one of Bridges best performances. McCarthy was positive about the film calling it "beautifully made in all respects" but noted that as a mainstream film about profound issues and emotions some audiences will appreciate it but others may find it pretentious. Geoff Andrew of Time Out wrote: "As often with Weir, there's considerably less here than meets the eye."

Accolades

Home media
With video and audio quality superseding previous home video releases, Fearless was released on Blu-ray Disc by the Warner Archive Collection in November 2013.

Notes

References

External links
 
 

1993 drama films
1993 films
American drama films
1990s English-language films
Films about aviation accidents or incidents
Films about grieving
Films based on American novels
Films directed by Peter Weir
Films scored by Maurice Jarre
Films set in San Francisco
Films set in the San Francisco Bay Area
Films shot in San Francisco
Films about post-traumatic stress disorder
Warner Bros. films
1990s American films